How Long may refer to:

Music
How Long (album), a 2000 album by L.V., and the title song
"How Long" (Ace song), 1974
"How Long" (Charlie Puth song), 2017
"How Long" (Hinder song)
"How Long" (Tove Lo song) a 2022 song by Tove Lo from the Euphoria soundtrack (Season 2)
"How Long" (J. D. Souther song), notably covered by the Eagles
"How Long" (The View song)
"How Long", a song by Labelle on the album Back to Now
"How Long (Betcha' Got a Chick on the Side)", a 1975 song by the Pointer Sisters
"How Long", a song by Information Society from Hack
"How Long, How Long Blues", a 1928 classic blues song by Leroy Carr
"How Long", a 1952 song by Fats Domino
"How Long", a 1991 song by Dire Straits from the album On Every Street
"How Long?", a song by How to Destroy Angels from the album Welcome Oblivion
 "How Long?", a song by Vampire Weekend from Father of the Bride (2019)
"How Long", a 2012 song from North (Matchbox Twenty album)
"How Long", a song written by Lionel Richie for Kenny Rogers's 1983 album We've Got Tonight

Other
How Long, a play by Gibson Kente

See also

Length